The red-billed starling (Spodiopsar sericeus) is a species of starling in the family Sturnidae. It is found in south and southeastern China.

References

red-billed starling
Birds of South China
Birds of Hong Kong
Birds of Hainan
red-billed starling
red-billed starling
Taxonomy articles created by Polbot